Muping Town is a town and the county seat of Baoxing County in Sichuan province of southwest China. In the late 1800s, under its alternative rendering Moupin, it developed a reputation for biodiversity among western naturalists, so a number of species carry the name Moupin or the specific epithets moupinensis and moupinense, these include the Moupin pig, Moupin pika, Moupin broad-muzzled bat, Pterolophia moupinensis, Salix moupinensis, and Fragaria moupinensis.

References

Township-level divisions of Sichuan